The Death of Dick Long is a 2019 black comedy-drama film directed and produced by Daniel Scheinert and written by Billy Chew. The film stars Michael Abbott Jr., Virginia Newcomb, Andre Hyland, Sarah Baker, Jess Weixler, Roy Wood Jr., and Sunita Mani. It premiered at the 2019 Sundance Film Festival on January 26, 2019, and was released by A24 on September 27, 2019.

Plot
Late at night, friends Dick, Zeke, and Earl hang out together until Dick sustains unexplained severe injuries. The friends leave him at an emergency room.

Earl returns home and tells his girlfriend Lake that he has to leave town for a family emergency, but he attends a shift at his warehouse job.

Zeke sneaks into bed, fooling his wife Lydia into thinking he had been asleep. She asks him to drive their daughter Cynthia to school. He agrees and accidentally pulls Dick's wallet out: he and Earl took it off of him as he lay unconscious. Zeke takes the driver's license and puts it on the counter and gets Cynthia to the garage but realizes his back seat is covered in blood and he covers it with a sheet.

As the two men begin their day, Doctor Richter—the emergency room doctor—calls the police department to tell them Dick has died overnight from severe rectal hemorrhaging.

As Zeke goes inside a gas station and inside the store, Cynthia tells Officer Dudley about Dick's wallet. Zeke notices the blood in the back seat has soaked into Cynthia's dress. He runs inside to keep the police officer from seeing and gives her the wallet.

Earl arrives at Zeke's house and they scrub the blood from out of the back seat. Earl takes Cynthia to school in his truck where he speaks to Dick's widow Jane. The duo decide to dump the car in a river to hide the evidence.

At the police station, Sheriff Spenser enlists Dudley to help her with the murder. The next morning Zeke lies to Lydia saying their car was stolen the night before, so she calls the police and Dudley and Spenser arrive to question her. The interrogation is brief and Richter calls the police and tells them horse semen was in Dick's rectum.

Cynthia overhears Zeke and tells Lydia how he drove her in the car that morning. Lydia confronts Zeke about the inconsistencies and Zeke breaks down and tells her that Dick is dead and he confesses the three friends participated in zoophilic acts for years, and Dick died from having sex with Dick and Jane's horse Comet. Lydia demands that he leave.

At Jane's house, she walks to their stable to find Zeke drunk. The two go to Zeke's home where Dudley is waiting to question about the connection between the car, wallet and Dick's death not realizing Jane is Dick's widow. Lydia and Zeke's stories spiral out of control until he runs out of the kitchen. Dudley chases him and Lydia tells Jane to stay so she can tell her how Dick died. Zeke frees Comet and begs him to run away as Dudley arrests him.

The next morning, Dudley and Spenser walk to the site of the ditched car and the sheriff explains that Zeke has been released. Dudley is incredulous but her boss explains that these charges would ruin the lives of Lydia, Cynthia and Jane. Zeke goes to Cynthia's school where Lydia tells him to get out of their lives.

That night, Zeke goes to Earl and Lake's motel room. Zeke asks what Earl's plan is and he says that he'll come up with something, and starts playing "How You Remind Me" on his guitar.

Cast 
 Daniel Scheinert as Dick Long
 Michael Abbott Jr. as Ezekiel "Zeke" Olsen, a friend of Dick Long
 Virginia Newcomb as Lydia Olsen, Zeke's wife
 Andre Hyland as Earl Wyeth, Dick and Zeke's friend
 Sarah Baker as Officer Dudley, a relatively inexperienced police officer
 Jess Weixler as Jane Long, a schoolteacher and Dick's wife
 Roy Wood Jr. as Dr. Richter, the physician who discovers Dick
 Sunita Mani as Lake Travis, Earl's friend
 Poppy Cunningham as Cynthia Olsen, Lydia and Zeke's daughter
 Janelle Cochrane as Sheriff Spenser, Officer Dudley's superior and mentor
 Eugene Henry Jr as Ted, a store clerk

Release
The Death of Dick Long premiered at the 2019 Sundance Film Festival on January 26, 2019. It was theatrically released by A24 in the United States on September 27, 2019.

Critical response
The site's critics consensus reads: "The Death of Dick Long mixes dark humor with provocative ideas to produce a sharp blend that's admittedly uneven but uniquely satisfying." On Metacritic, it has a weighted average score of 69 out of 100 based on 21 reviews, indicating "generally favorable reviews". Writing for The A.V. Club, Ignatiy Vishnevetsky gave the film a B−, favorably comparing it to the absurdity and grotesqueness of Swiss Army Man, saying the tone "falls somewhere between irony and sincere fondness".

Inspiring events 
As the death of the titular character is due to internal injuries sustained from intercourse with a horse the film evokes a parallel to the real life death of Kenneth Pinyan, an engineer who worked for Boeing and resided in Gig Harbor, Washington. Those events were widely reported by The Seattle Times as the Enumclaw horse sex case.

References

External links 
 

2019 films
2019 black comedy films
2010s crime comedy-drama films
2019 independent films
American black comedy films
American crime comedy-drama films
American independent films
A24 (company) films
Films set in Alabama
Zoophilia in culture
2010s English-language films
2010s American films